Zac Fulton (born 14 August 2001) is an Australian rugby league footballer who plays as a  forward for the Manly-Warringah Sea Eagles in the NRL and Blacktown Workers Sea Eagles in the NSW Cup.

Background
Zac made history by being the first third generation of his family to play first grade at the one club, being the son of Scott and grandson of Rugby league Immortal, Bob.

Playing career

2022
Fulton made his first grade debut in round 20 of the 2022 NRL season for Manly against the Sydney Roosters.

References

External links
Manly-Warringah profile

Living people
Australian rugby league players
Australian people of English descent
Manly Warringah Sea Eagles players
Rugby league players from Sydney
Rugby league second-rows
2001 births